Ben James Wright (born 5 December 1987) is an English cricketer. He is a right-handed batsman and a right-arm medium-fast bowler. He plays for Glamorgan. He was selected to play in the England Under-19 tour to play against Bangladesh in 2005–06.

He made 72 on his first-class debut in 2006 and in 2007 Wright scored his maiden first-class century against Leicestershire County Cricket Club at Grace Road.

He was selected for the home U19 series and captained the team for a Test in place of the suspended Rory Hamilton-Brown.

Ben Wright also spent the 2008/09, 09/10 and 11/12 seasons in South Australia playing club cricket for Northern Districts.

In September 2015, it was announced that he was leaving Glamorgan, to start a new career outside cricket.

References

External links
 

1987 births
Living people
Cricketers from Preston, Lancashire
English cricketers of the 21st century
English cricketers
Glamorgan cricketers
Wales National County cricketers